Gaywood may refer to:

 Gaywood, Houston, Texas
 Gaywood, Norfolk, England
 Gaywood River, Norfolk, England
 Nick Gaywood (born 1963), English cricketer
 Richard Gaywood (fl. 1650–1680), English engraver